The CM-32 "Clouded Leopard", officially Taiwan Infantry Fighting Vehicle (TIFV), is an eight-wheeled armoured vehicle currently being produced for the Republic of China Army. It is based on the 6x6 CM-31 designed by Timoney Technology Limited of Ireland and is further developed by the Ordnance Readiness Development Center.

According to the Taipei Times, it was named after the Formosan clouded leopard, an indigenous animal, to show that the vehicle is "agile and swift".

Development
Production started in 2007, with an initial order for 600 units. It is estimated that up to 1,400 CM-32s may end up being in operational service.

The Delco LAV-25 turret was tested on the first two prototypes but was not adopted on ground of cost and marginal firepower advantage compared to foreign vehicles; instead an indigenous turret armed with a 20 mm T75 revolver cannon was planned in the interest of getting the IFV into service as quickly as possible, and a prototype was demonstrated in 2009.  It was hoped that any deficiency in terms of firepower can be alleviated by adopting the cannon to use the Mk 244 Mod 0 APDS ammunition already being ordered by the Republic of China Navy alongside the Phalanx Block 1B weapon systems, but issues with barrel life proved insurmountable, and in the meantime the 30 mm Bushmaster II chaingun was ultimately chosen instead and will be acquired from Orbital ATK. A prototype turret built on this definitive requirement was spotted in May 2015 and unveiled to the public in August 2017.

In 2019 the Ministry of National Defense announced that over the course of the development process 17 shortcomings with the system had been identified and corrected. Shortcomings identified included flaws in the types steel armor, oil leaks, and a lack of interchangeable spare parts. It was discovered that the vehicles had to cover at least 5 km every two weeks to remain in optimal condition.

Design

The project was launched in 2002, at a cost of NT$700 million (US$21.9 million).

The armor of the CM-32 provides protection of 7.62 mm AP rounds, while the frontal arc withstands 12.7 mm AP rounds. NBC protection and fire suppression systems are also standard. The V-shaped hull provides protection from landmines and can withstand 12 kg of TNT under any wheel. In its basic APC form the CM-32 is armed with a 40 mm automatic grenade launcher and a 7.62 mm co-axial machinegun, both mounted in a remote weapons station.

Production and service history
In 2012 Chung-Hsin Electric and Machinery Manufacturing Corp. (CHEM) was awarded the contract for chassis production. CHEM violated their contract by allegedly substituting a number of poor quality Chinese parts in to save money. This affected the first 326 chassis.  CHEM’s chairman, president, vice president and other officials were found guilty and sentenced to jail time over the scandal in 2021.

Performance records from 2008 to 2018 indicate an engine lifespan of 780,000 km. The type is a regular participant in the Han Kuang Exercises.

Variants 

In addition to the infantry carriers, other planned variants include command vehicle, NBC reconnaissance vehicle, mortar carrier (can be configured with either an 81 mm or 120 mm mortar), and assault gun (armed with a 105 mm rifled gun). The Ministry of National Defense is exploring a 155mm self-propelled howitzer based on the CM-32.

CM-31
The CM-31 is the original 6x6 designed by Timoney Technology Limited of Ireland, it was never mass-produced.

CM-32
Command vehicle, same armament as CM-33. In service as of 2014.

CM-33
Base variant, with 40mm grenade launcher and 7.62mm machine gun mounted in a remote weapon station. In service as of 2014. A total of 378 CM-32 and CM-33 have been produced.

CM-34
Four prototype vehicles passed primary pre-mass production testing in October 2014.

The CM-34 participated, alongside the CM-32, in the 35th annual Han Kuang Exercise armed with a Mk44 Bushmaster II. The Taiwanese military expects to produce 284 CM-34s. It is in service as of 2019. In August 2020, 21 more vehicles were ordered for the Taiwanese military police.

Taiwanese ceramics manufacturer HCG (和成欣業) will supply the vehicle's armor.

Cloud Leopard II M2 prototype
Taiwan’s Ministry of National Defense (MND) exhibited a prototype of the next-generation 8×8 Cloud Leopard II armoured vehicle development in public for the first time at the 2019 Taipei Aerospace & Defense Technology Exhibition.
It is expected that the prototype will be able to configurate into a mortar platform, a self-propelled howitzer and a Mobile Gun System(105mm gun).

Gallery

See also

Comparable vehicles

 Stryker
 LAV III/LAV AFV/LAV-25/ASLAV
 K808 Armored Personnel Carrier
 Tusan AFV
 Boxer
 Freccia IFV
 BTR-90
 VPK-7829 Bumerang
 ZBL-08
 Type 96 Armored Personnel Carrier
 Type 16 maneuver combat vehicle
 Patria AMV
 BTR-4
 Saur 2
 VBCI
 KTO Rosomak
 FNSS Pars
 MOWAG Piranha

References

Sources
 Jane's Information Group article: "CM-32 enters pre-production phase in Taiwan”
 John Pike. "CM32 8X8 Cloud Leopard Armored Vehicle". GlobalSecurity.org
 "Comparative Levels of Ballistic Protection" on Armoured Fighting Vehicles - Globalsecurity
 MND denies armor on carrier vehicles is defective - Taipei Times. March 21, 2012
 ‘Clouded Leopard’ delivery delayed until 2019 - Taipei Times. December 27, 2012
 About 60 detained in military probe - Taipei Times. June 12, 2015
 Thirty-three indicted in military procurement case - Taipei Times. October 9, 2015
 The Modern Battle Tanks Of Asia - Monitoring the 21st Century Asian Arms Race
 The Eight By Eight APCs Transforming Modern War - Monitoring the 21st Century Asian Arms Race
 Taiwan's military-industrial complex dominates at arms show

External links
 
 NCSIST videos: 雲豹甲車 A05 八觀全景系統 2016 0927

Armoured fighting vehicles of the post–Cold War period
Armoured fighting vehicles of the Republic of China
Military vehicles introduced in the 2000s
Eight-wheeled vehicles
Wheeled armoured fighting vehicles